Robert J. Cleary (born September 30, 1955) is an American lawyer who has served as the United States Attorney for the District of New Jersey and for the Southern District of Illinois. He was the lead prosecutor in the Unabomber case. He is currently a partner at Proskauer Rose.

Biography

Cleary was born in Brooklyn, New York in 1955. He graduated from The College of William & Mary  in 1977 with a Bachelor of Business Administration and received his J.D. degree from Fordham University School of Law in 1980. He was admitted to the New York bar in 1982 and to the United States District Court for the Southern District of New York in 1983.

From 1987 to 1994, Cleary served as an Assistant U.S. Attorney for the Southern District of New York, eventually becoming Chief of the Major Crimes Unit. From to 1994 to 1999, he was the First Assistant United States Attorney for the District of New Jersey.

In 1996, Cleary was appointed lead prosecutor in the Unabomber case, United States v. Theodore J. Kaczynski. Kaczynski was charged with sending a series of letter bombs from 1978 to 1995, killing three people and injuring 23. Kaczynski was convicted and is serving a life sentence without the possibility of parole.

Cleary was sworn in as U.S. Attorney for the District of New Jersey on November 16, 1999, after his predecessor Faith S. Hochberg was appointed to be a federal judge on the U.S. District Court for the District of New Jersey. He served in this position until January 17, 2002, when he was succeeded by Christopher J. Christie. Later in 2002, he was appointed as Acting United States Attorney for the Southern District of Illinois while nominee Miriam Miquelon awaited confirmation.

In June 2002, Cleary joined the New York City law firm Proskauer Rose as partner.

In February 2006, in the wake of a police investigation codenamed Operation Slapshot, National Hockey League commissioner Gary Bettman announced that the NHL had retained Cleary to conduct its own investigation into the involvement of Rick Tocchet, an assistant coach for the Phoenix Coyotes, in an illegal bookmaking ring. After reviewing Cleary's report, Bettman announced in November 2007 that Tocchet would be reinstated in the NHL the following February.

References

Living people
1955 births
People from Brooklyn
College of William & Mary alumni
Fordham University School of Law alumni
United States Attorneys for the District of New Jersey
United States Attorneys for the Southern District of Illinois
Proskauer Rose partners
New Jersey lawyers
20th-century American lawyers
21st-century American lawyers